The 2016 NA LCS season was the fourth year of the North American League of Legends Championship Series. It was divided into spring and summer splits, each consisting of a regular season and playoff stage. Regular season games were played in the Riot Games Studios in Los Angeles, California.

Format 
Teams compete in a double round robin tournament over the course of nine weeks during the regular season, with matches being best-of-three. The top six teams from the regular season advanced to the playoff stage, with the top two teams receiving a bye to the semifinals. The seventh place team qualifies for the next split of the LCS but does not participate in playoffs. The bottom three teams play in a promotion/relegation tournament against the top two NA Challenger Series teams. Playoffs were single-elimination and matches were best-of-five. The winner of the summer split automatically qualified for the 2016 World Championship, while the team with the most cumulative championship points from the spring and summer splits also qualified for World Championship. A final team, the winner of the regional finals, also qualified for the World Championship.

Offseason changes 
As the team with the worst record in the 2015 NA LCS Summer regular season, Team Dragon Knights was automatically relegated to the NA Challenger Series. As the eighth and ninth team places respectively, Team 8 and Enemy eSports were obligated to play in a promotion tournament against the second and third place Challenger teams, who were Team Coast and Team Imagine respectively. Enemy was relegated after losing to Coast 3–0, but Team 8 beat Imagine 3–1 to remain in the LCS. The two teams that won the Promotion matches both sold their spots to other teams before the start of the spring split. The LA Renegades were automatically promoted by winning the NA Challenger Series.

A total of three teams, Team Coast, Team 8, and Gravity Gaming sold their NA LCS spots, all to new esports organizations that had been created for the sole purpose of being in the LCS. Team Coast sold their spot to NRG eSports, Team 8 sold their spot to Immortals, and Gravity's spot was sold to Echo Fox. Team Impulse had announced their intentions to sell their spot, but failed to do so prior to the original deadline. However, after the Spring Split, Team Impulse managed to sel it's spot to Phoenix1 just before the start of the Summer Split.

Spring

Teams and rosters

Regular season 

† NRG Esports won the tiebreaker over Team SoloMid due to head-to-head matchup in the regular season.

Playoffs 
The 2016 NA LCS Spring finals saw a rematch of the previous split's finals between Team SoloMid and Counter Logic Gaming. The finals were played in Las Vegas, Nevada at the Mandalay Bay Events Center.

Bracket

Summer

Teams and rosters

Regular season 

† Team Envy won the tiebreaker over Apex Gaming due to head-to-head matchup in the regular season.

Playoffs 

The summer finals were held at the Air Canada Centre in Toronto, Ontario, Canada, the first time an NA LCS match had been played outside of the United States.

Bracket

Regional finals

References 

League of Legends Championship Series seasons
North American League of Legends Championship
North American League of Legends Championship
North American League of Legends Championship
2016 in Toronto